Silver Hawk Motors of Cobham, Surrey, England, was a motor manufacturer from 1920 until 1921. It was founded by Sir (Albert) Noel Campbell Macklin after he parted company with his Eric-Campbell project, and before he founded both the Invicta and Railton car marques. The cars were built in a garage at Macklin's private home.

The car was a stylish high performance sporting design but the company's lack of both industrial backing and a volume selling standard model meant that the project was short-lived.

Silver Hawk car

The Silver Hawk was similar to Macklin's previous Eric-Campbell design. It had a stylish aluminium body, external exhaust and used a tuned and lightened 1,498cc side-valve engine made by Coventry-Simplex rated at 10/35 hp that drove the rear wheels through a cone clutch and three or four speed transmission. The suspension used semi elliptic leaf springs at the front and cantilever springs at the rear.

Around 12 cars were made.

Competition
In 1920 Violette Cordery drove a Silver Hawk in the 1500 cc ‘light cars’ class at the South Harting hill climb.  She won the ladies' race at the Junior Car Club May meeting in 1921 at a speed of 49.7 mph, probably in a Silver Hawk.

A team of three cars was entered for the 1920 Coupe des Voiturettes at Le Mans.  Two cars finished in 6th and 7th places.

References 

Defunct motor vehicle manufacturers of England
Defunct companies based in Surrey